Isata Dora Bangura is a Sierra Leonean educator and politician. She was the running mate of presidential candidate Charles Margai in Sierra Leone's 2018 General Election. She is the second woman to run for the office of vice-president in Sierra Leonean history.

Early life
Bangura is from north-east region of Sierra Leone.

She began her teaching career in 1976. In 2018, she left the teaching profession to run for political office.

Political career
In 2006, Bangura joined the People's Movement for Democratic Change (PMDC) party which was formed as the result of a schism between Charles Margai and his supporters and the Sierra Leone People's Party. She distinguished herself as an advocate for women's issues.

2018 Election
In 2018, she became the party nominee for vice-president of Sierra Leone and ran alongside presidential candidate Charles Margai in the General Election.

The presidential campaign struggled to gain traction as many Sierra Leonean's resented Margai for supporting Ernest Bai Koroma and the All People's Congress in the 2012 General Elections.

The PMDC won 0.4% of the vote and were unable to win any seats in parliament.

References 

Living people
21st-century Sierra Leonean women politicians
People's Movement for Democratic Change politicians
21st-century Sierra Leonean politicians
Sierra Leonean women vice-presidential candidates
Sierra Leonean women academics
Year of birth missing (living people)